Elsberry can refer to:
 Wesley R. Elsberry, marine biologist
 Elsberry, Missouri
See also: Jacoby Ellsbury, Major League Baseball player